Bangladesh hosts a number of endangered languages that are defined as languages at risk of falling out of use, generally because it has few surviving speakers. If it loses all of its native speakers, it becomes an extinct language. UNESCO defines four levels of language endangerment between "safe" (not endangered) and "extinct":
 Vulnerable
 Definitely endangered
 Severely endangered
 Critically endangered

Status
According to Bangladesh Bureau of Statistics data from 2011, the country has 27 "small anthropological groups" consisting of 17,84,000 people in total. Ethnologists in Bangladesh and indigenous leaders claim that 48 indigenous communities, a total of 5 million people, are present in Bangladesh. They host 4 language families with 30 ethno-languages. 12-18 of them are endangered at varying degrees. International Mother Language Institute (IMLI) in Dhaka, a government institute, launched a project to reservation and mobilization of 37 languages (including Bengali, the dominant language of Bangladesh). Only 4 of the target languages have their own scripts — Chakma, Marma, Mru, and Meithei. Some other indigenous communities, especially the 2 lakh people living in Rajshahi, use a language called "Sadri" adopting alphabets from Hindi, Bangla, Urdu and other languages. It is used in the Sylhet tea garden area by Telugu, Santhali, Nepali and Rai communities as a lingua franca.

The Hill Tracts, a forested upland area in southeastern Bangladesh, is home to more than a dozen indigenous peoples. 50% of the indigenous people of there have no formal schooling; less than 8% complete primary education, and only 2% completes secondary. Most of the children don't understand the instructions written in Bengali. In north-eastern Bangladesh, Hari, Banai, Dalui, and Rajbongshi indigenous communities have started to use Bengali leaving their native languages due to the lack of social and economical recognition.

List

In addition to this list International Mother Language Institute (IMLI) in Dhaka counts a number of other languages as endangered including Lushai (959 speakers), Khumi (3369 speakers), Khiyang (3899 speakers), Rengmatia (40 speakers), and Patra (203 speakers).

References

Bangladesh